Pycnanthemum virginianum, the Virginia or common mountain-mint, is a plant in the mint family, Lamiaceae. It is a herbaceous plant with narrow, opposite, simple leaves, on wiry, green stems. The flowers are white with purplish spotting, borne in summer. Like most plants in the genus, the foliage has a strong mint fragrance when crushed or disturbed. It is native to the eastern United States and eastern Canada.

The flowers are visited by many insects, including honeybees, cuckoo bees, sweat bees, thread-waisted wasps, potter wasps, tachinid flies, wedge-shaped beetles, and pearl crescent butterflies.

References

External links

virginianum
Flora of the Northeastern United States
Flora of the North-Central United States
Flora of the Southeastern United States
Flora of Eastern Canada
Flora of the Appalachian Mountains
Flora of the Great Lakes region (North America)

Plants described in 1753
Taxa named by Carl Linnaeus
Flora without expected TNC conservation status